Tridib Kumar Chattopadhyay (born 30 October 1958) is a Bengali writer and editor. He is the General Secretary of the Publishers & Booksellers Guild, organiser of International Kolkata Book Fair. He is the present owner of Patra Bharati.

Early life
Chattopadhyay was born in 1958 in Kolkata. His father Dinesh Chandra Chattopadhyay was an eminent author and publisher. He passed Higher Secondary Examination in 1975 from Hindu School and completed M.Sc. in Botany from the Calcutta University.

Career
Chattopadhyay started his literary career in 1976 in Kishore Bharati Magazine, founded by his father Dinesh Chandra. His first novel Haath (The Hand) was published in 1985. He achieved Amrita Kamal Child Literature award for his first book Chaya Murti in 1990. Chattopadhyay wrote and edited number science fiction, mystery thriller and Jagu Mama detective series as well as stories for adults. His novel named Mukhosher Arale was screened on television. In 2007, the then President of India felicitated him for the contribution in Bengali Children's literature. He received Rotary Banga Ratna Award and Atulya Smriti Samman for literary works. Chattopadhyay, presently the chief editor of Kishore Bharati magazine, operates Patra Bharati Publication house in Kolkata. He is a regular writer of Bengali magazines and guest lecturer of the University of Calcutta on Diploma courses in Book Publishing. Chattopadhyay is also a life member of Indian Science Congress Association, World Wildlife Fund and honorary general secretary of the Publishers & Booksellers Guild since 2004.

Works
 Sabdhan Suspense
 Jagu Mama Rahasyo Samagra (in 4 volumes)
 Mrityuke Ami Dekhechi
 Dwiper Naam Kaladera
 Anantababu Kothay
 Tumi Pitamoho
 Voyer Arale Voy
 Boroder Baro
 Gopon Premer Golpo
 Bhoutik Aloukik
 Asi Baje Jhonjhon
 Arbi Punthir Rahosyo
 Aajo Romanchokor
 Nil Kakrar Rahossyo
 Raktorahosyo
Ekhono Gaye Kanta Dey

References

1958 births
Living people
Bengali writers
Bengali novelists
Indian children's writers
Writers from Kolkata
20th-century Indian novelists
Novelists from West Bengal
Indian magazine editors
University of Calcutta alumni